Ved Parkash  is an Indian politician and former member of the Sixth Legislative Assembly of Delhi. He is a member of the Bharatiya Janata Party. He resigned from Aam Aadmi Party and represented Bawana (Assembly constituency) of Delhi.

Born the third child of his parents he was not interested in politics in early life. He has passed 12th class from government boys' senior secondary school in the year 1993. He went to Kirorimal College and dropped out in the second year.

Early life and education
He completed 10th from C.B.S.E. and 12th from Haryana Board. He studied at Kurukshetra University earning Mass Communication degree.

Political career
Ved Parkash has been a MLA for one term. He represented the Bawana constituency and was a member of the Aam Aadmi Party political party.

Posts held

See also
 Aam Aadmi Party
 Bawana
 Delhi Legislative Assembly
 Politics of India
 Sixth Legislative Assembly of Delhi

References 

1973 births
Aam Aadmi Party politicians from Delhi
Delhi MLAs 2015–2020
Living people
People from Delhi
People from New Delhi
Bharatiya Janata Party politicians from Delhi